East End is a mountain located at the northeastern end of the McDowell Mountains and about  north northeast of Scottsdale, Arizona. The mountain is mostly covered in rocky boulders, and is the site of the ancient Marcus Landslide.

References

External links 
 East End. Summitpost.org.
 McDowell Sonoran Conservancy.
 East End Trail, McDowell Mountains Preserve. Hike Arizona.

Landforms of Maricopa County, Arizona
Mountains of Arizona
Mountains of Maricopa County, Arizona